Upper Rideau Lake is located in the municipality of Rideau Lakes, United Counties of Leeds and Grenville in Eastern Ontario, Canada. It is in the Saint Lawrence River Drainage Basin, and geographically the highest lake on the Rideau Canal System.

Hydrology
Upper Rideau Lake is the summit of the Rideau Canal system, with a surface elevation of 124.65m above sea level. Despite having the highest elevation, Upper Rideau Lake is not the top of the watershed. Water flows north to the Rideau River, there is no flow south to the Cataraqui River.

Inflow is from Westport Sand Lake, part of the Rideau Lake Subwatershed.

Outflow, through the Narrows Lock, is to the Big Rideau Lake, which eventually flows to the Saint Lawrence River via the Ottawa River.

Geology
The Rideau Lake Fault (an ancient fracture in the Earth's crust due to tension) explains the large exposure of granite that can be observed on much of Upper Rideau Lake's northern shore.
The northern half of Upper Rideau Lake is located in the Algonquin Highlands. Bedrock in this hilly, Precambrian landscape consists mostly of gneisses and marble and is covered in a very thin layer of mixed glacial sediment. The southern half of Upper Rideau Lake is located between the Algonquin Highlands and the Smiths Falls Limestone Plain. Bedrock here consists of Paleozoic quartzose sandstone, dolomite, and conglomerate covered in a variety of sediments; mixed glacial sediment, sandy glacial till, silt and clay, organic deposits, and sand.

History
Before the creation of the Rideau Canal (1826-1832), Upper, Big, and Lower Rideau Lakes were one lake. The original plan was to have it remain as one lake by excavating the naturally rocky shallows on the Upper Narrows. When this proved difficult and expensive, Lt. Colonel John By finalized plans to build a dam and a lock (now Narrows Lock), separating and therefore creating Upper Rideau Lake.
The creation of Narrows Lock raised the water in this area by approximately 8 feet (2.5m). This flooding created some immediate changes to the land. Drowned shorelines resulted in a number of newly created marshes and many dead standing trees.

Slack Water System
Water levels along the Rideau Canal system are carefully monitored by the Ministry of Natural Resources and Forestry and Parks Canada. Water levels are managed for recreational purposes, allowing for adequate draft during the navigation season and for residents with docks, boathouses, and shorefront. In late May water levels are at their maximum, gradually declining throughout the summer, reaching the lowest point in October to the winter operating level. During this cycle the range of water height is approximately 1 meter.

Settlements
The Village of Westport is located at the west end of the lake. The Village of Newboro is located at the South end of the lake, at the junction between the Upper Rideau Lake and Newboro Lake. Both villages offer accommodations, restaurants, shopping, and watercraft docking.
Shoreline is largely privately owned by seasonal and permanent residents. Federally owned land includes Foley Mountain Conservation Area and land surrounding the two lock stations.

Recreation
Upper Rideau Lake is widely known for its bass fishing. Other water related activities include boating, paddling, and swimming. On shore there are golf courses, and surrounding trails for hiking, snowshoeing, and cross country skiing. Waterfront accommodations are available at a variety of marinas, campgrounds, and retreats. In 2015, Newboro lockstation recorded 5,355 vessel passages, while Narrows Lockstation reported 6,208.

Foley Mountain Conservation Area
Located on Upper Rideau Lake near Westport, Foley Mountain Conservation Area boasts 9 km of hiking trails, Spy rock scenic lookout, educational programs, discovery center, picnic sites, and natural swimming area.

Rideau Trail
The longest trail in eastern Ontario, stretching from Kingston to Ottawa. This scenic hiking trail follows the Rideau Canal as closely as possible and runs along the North shore of the Upper Rideau Lake.

Regulations

Fishing Regulations
Upper Rideau Lake is situated within Fisheries Management Zone 18. For information about licenses, open seasons, and catch limits refer to the latest Ontario Fishing Regulations.

Canal Regulations
The Rideau Canal Lock stations operate from mid-May until mid-October each year. Lockage and mooring fees are charged based on vessel length (per foot). For more information concerning operation hours, fees, and more visit parkscanada.gc.ca.

Wildlife

Fish
Rideau Lakes is renowned for its bass fishing. During the creation of the canal drowned lands saw bass populations thrive as they took advantage of the flooded shoreline habitat.
In addition to the abundance of largemouth and smallmouth bass, species of fish in the Upper Rideau Lake include sunfish, bluegill, rock bass, black crappie, yellow perch, northern pike, walleye, and lake trout.
Ministry of Natural Resources fisheries specialists have reported that the aquatic habitat is stable for warm water fish, as pH conditions are within range for a healthy environment.  Fishery quotas have remained stable, with the exception of the yellow perch quota being increased in 2013.
However, it is also cited that summertime warming of the water column and oxygen depletion may be a cause of stress to certain aquatic species.

Birds, reptiles, amphibians & mammals
Upper Rideau Lake inhabits a large diversity of wildlife.
Some of the most commonly observed birds include common loon, great blue heron, green heron, osprey, turkey vulture, pileated woodpecker, Canada goose, mallard duck, common merganser, hooded merganser, ring-billed gull, and trumpeter swan.
Most commonly observed reptiles and amphibians are map turtle, painted turtle, snapping turtle, northern leopard frog, American bullfrog, garter snake, northern water snake, and black rat snake.
Most commonly observed mammals include squirrel, chipmunk, coyote, fox, porcupine, skunk, beaver, otter, muskrat, mink, raccoon, and white-tailed deer.

Endangered Species
Upper Rideau Lake is part of the range of a number of animals listed as species at risk. If you spot any of these species along the Rideau Canal you are urged to record date, time, location, and species information to drop off at any lockstation.
Endangered species include the loggerhead shrike and spotted turtle.
Threatened species include golden-winged warbler, least bittern, peregrine falcon, chimney swift, red-headed woodpecker, grey fox, Blanding's turtle, musk turtle, and black rat snake,
Special concern species include cerulean warbler, Louisiana waterthrush, short-eared owl, yellow rail, red-shouldered hawk, southern flying squirrel, five-lined skink, map turtle, snapping turtle, milksnake, and ribbon snake.

Water Quality
The Rideau Valley Conservation Authority rated the water quality of Upper Rideau Lake as poor in their 2014 Watershed Report (data collected from 2005-2014). Contributing factors to this ratings include elevated nutrient concentrations, periods of reduced oxygen availability, clear water, and occasionally elevated pH levels.
High nutrient concentrations are part of the natural aging process of a lake. In this case, aging may be accelerated due to a high runoff of nutrients from residential shoreline areas, as well as areas of drowned land resulting from the construction of the Rideau Canal. This is concerning as high nutrient concentrations has enabled the excessive growth of aquatic plants and algae blooms.

Westport Sewage Discharge
In April 2014, The Village of Westport dumped 24 million litres of untreated sewage into Upper Rideau Lake following a 2-3 year collapse of their sewage treatment system. With a sewage lagoon ready to burst, millions of liters were shipped away for treatment, while two emergency discharges of over 12 million litres went directly into the lake, fueling blue-green algae growth.
Before 1996 the Village of Westport had no treatment plan in place, and would dump untreated sewage twice annually into the lake.  In 2018  the Village of Westport completed a Large SubSurface Disposal System (LSSDS) costing roughly $3,000,000 to treat the sewage.  As of March 2019 there has been no discharges for the past 12 months.

Blue-Green algae issues
Most recently, in August 2014, toxins were confirmed present in blue-green algae blooms. Leeds, Grenville & Lanark District Health Unit issued a public health notice warning not to drink the lake water, or allow pets or livestock to do so. This outbreak can be attributed to the sewage dump, erosion, high spring runoff, and zebra mussel population among other causes. Blue-green algae blooms, although not always toxic, is a repeated issue for residents and visitors of Upper Rideau Lake.

Sustainability
Plans for the management, protection, and sustainability of the Rideau Canal, including Upper Rideau Lake, are:

Rideau Canal National Historic Site of Canada Management Plan (2005) http://www.pc.gc.ca/eng/docs/r/on/rideau/pd-mp/index.aspx

Rideau Canal World Heritage Site Management Plan (2005)

Organizations that serve to ensure long-term wellness of the lake are:

Upper Rideau Lake Association (founded 1989). This non-profit organization focuses primarily on water quality and improving the lake environment.

Friends of the Rideau (founded 2009). A non-profit organization working to promote enjoyment of the Rideau Canal, and to preserve its natural culture and heritage.

Solar Farm
North Burgess Solar Project, owned by Northland Power, is located North of Upper Rideau Lake on Highway 14. This green energy facility is a 10 MW ground-mounted photovoltaic solar project operating 40,000-50,000 solar panels and 30 DC to AC inverters. It is estimated to power approximately 2,000 Ontario homes.

See also
List of lakes in Ontario

References

 National Resources Canada

External links
Upper Rideau Lake Association
Friends of the Rideau
Rideau Heritage Route Tourism Association

Lakes of Leeds and Grenville United Counties